Latin words and phrases